The People's Liberal Party (Narodnoliberalna partiya, NLP) was a political party in Bulgaria.

History
One of the four factions to emerge from the old Liberal Party, the party was established by Stefan Stambolov in 1886 as the Bulgaria for itself organisation, before becoming the NLP the following year. It was the ruling party until Stambolov was dismissed from his post of Prime Minister by Prince Ferdinand in 1894, after which it was briefly banned. In the 1899 elections the party emerged as the second largest in the National Assembly with 19 of the 169 seats, and during the same year it briefly merged with the Radoslavist Liberal Party to form the United Liberal Party, before demerging. The 1901 elections saw the party win 24 seats, although it was reduced to being the fourth largest party. In the elections the following year the NLP was reduced to just eight seats.

The party fared badly until Balkan Wars of 1912–1913, winning eight seats in 1903, just one in 1908 and six in 1911. After the war the party ran in the next two elections in a coalition with the Liberal Party and the Young Liberals Party; in the 1913 elections the NLP won 26 seats, making it the third largest party in the National Assembly, and went on to win 31 seats in the elections the following year.

After World War I the party split into two factions, one led by Dobri Petkov and the other by Nikola Genadiev. In the 1919 elections the Petkov faction won two seats, whilst the Genadiev group won just one. The 1920 elections saw both factions double their seat tally. However, this was the last election contested by either faction. Later in 1920 the Genadiev group merged with the Liberal Party (Radoslavists) and the Young Liberals Party to form the National Liberal Party.

References

Defunct political parties in Bulgaria
Liberal parties in Bulgaria
Defunct liberal political parties
Political parties established in 1886
Political parties disestablished in 1920
1886 establishments in Bulgaria